Cordini Glacier is a broad glacier that drains the Mount Bailey vicinity and flows between Lewis Point and James Nunatak to the east coast of Palmer Land. It was named by the Advisory Committee on Antarctic Names after Argentine scientist I. Rafael Cordini, the author of reports on the geology and ice of the Antarctic Peninsula and the Weddell Sea region.

References
 

Glaciers of Palmer Land